Indarbela phaga is a moth in the family Cossidae first described by Charles Swinhoe in 1894. It is found in India.

References

Metarbelinae
Moths described in 1894